Dharam Singh Gill (19 January 1919 in Gandiwind – 5 December 2001 in Chandigarh) was an Indian field hockey player who played as a right back in the gold medal winning team at the 1952 Helsinki Olympic Games.

References

External links
 

1919 births
2001 deaths
Field hockey players from Amritsar
Olympic field hockey players of India
Olympic gold medalists for India
Field hockey players at the 1952 Summer Olympics
Indian male field hockey players
Sportspeople from Amritsar district
Field hockey players from Punjab, India
Olympic medalists in field hockey
Medalists at the 1952 Summer Olympics
Recipients of the Dhyan Chand Award
Indian field hockey coaches